Đorđe Jovanović  (born January 22, 1980) is a former Serbian professional basketball player.

External links
 Profile at bgbasket.com
Profile at eurobasket.com

1980 births
Living people
Basketball League of Serbia players
OKK Beograd players
Serbian men's basketball players
Serbian expatriate basketball people in Bulgaria
Serbian expatriate basketball people in Jordan
Serbian expatriate basketball people in North Macedonia
Serbian expatriate basketball people in Poland
Serbian expatriate basketball people in Slovenia
Centers (basketball)